Prochorovka: Armor at Kursk is a board wargame published by Task Force Games in 1979 that attempts to simulate the 1943 Battle of Prokhorovka.

Background
On 12 July 1943, the German 2nd SS Panzer Korps ran into the Soviet 5th Guards Tank Army near the village of Prochorovka. Nearly 1400 tanks and assault guns  were involved in the battle, and nearly 300 tanks on each side were destroyed. Although the Russians withdrew from the village, the battle was the final strategic offensive that the Germans were able to launch on the Eastern Front.

Description
Prochorovka: Armor at Kursk is a microgame that pits the SS Panzer Corps against the 5th Guards Tank Army at Prochorovka, the largest tank battle of World War II.

Components
The microgame, packaged in a ziplock bag, contains:
14-page rulebook
108 counters
20" x 16" paper hex grid two-color map scaled at 400 m (437 yd) per hex, and divided into three sectors by a river and a rail line
Set-up card

Setup
Pieces are placed on the board on locations specified by the rules.

Gameplay
Each turn represents one hour.

First turn
The players dice for initiative in each of the three sectors. 
The first player in each sector fires at opposing units (but does not move.)
The second player may move tank units up to half their rated movement and then can fire. If artillery is moved, it cannot fire. 
The first player may also move tank units up to half their rated movement and then can fire. If artillery is moved, it cannot fire.
The player who wins initiative in two of the three sectors will be the first player in all subsequent turns.

Subsequent turns
First player
Moves
Fires
Facedown units (damaged in combat): Can either be flipped faceup but remain in place, or remain facedown and moved back three hexes
Second player: repeats first player's sequence of phases

Victory conditions
Both sides accumulate victory points for certain terrain features gained, as well as for destroying tanks and artillery. The player with the most points at the end of the game is the winner, although the level of victory, from slight to overwhelming, is determined by the ratio of victory points.

Publication history
Task Force Games had entered the market in 1979 with the microgame Starfire, and followed this immediately with a number of other microgames including Starfleet Battles. The fifth game released by Task Force was Prochorovka: Armor at Kursk, a microgame in a ziplock bag designed by Stephen V. Cole and published in 1979. Later the same year, the game was released as a boxed set retitled as simply Armor at Kursk.

Reception
In The Space Gamer No. 37, Nick Schuessler thought this was an uncomplicated game, but liked the low price and advised readers to "appreciate the reasonable price, and save Kursk/Prochorovka for the rainy Sunday afternoon when the thought of one more cycle of War in the Pacific turns your stomach."

In Issue 28 of Phoenix, Alestair Brown noted that careful play by the Russian player turned what seemed to be an unbalanced game into a very competitive match. He concluded "I have found Prochorovka an interesting and demanding game. In particular, I enjoyed its uncertainty [...] and the attention given to such items as artillery, [anti-tank] guns, engineers, and their special abilities."

Other reviews
 Casus Belli #16 (Aug 1983)
Moves #50, p24

References

Board games introduced in 1979
Task Force Games games
World War II board wargames